Maria Teresa Gerodias Carlson (October 15, 1963 – November 23, 2001) was a Filipina-American actress and beauty pageant contestant.

Early life
Carlson was born in Manila but grew up in San Francisco, California. At 16, she decided to stay in the Philippines when her family came on a visit. In 1979, she won Miss Young Philippines and represented the country in the Miss Young International Pageant in Tokyo.

Career
She starred in several films, including comedies with Chiquito, Redford White, and with the trio of Tito, Vic and Joey. She popularized the line "Si Ako, Si Ikaw" on the hit sitcom Chicks to Chicks.

Personal life
In 1983, Carlson married Rodolfo Fariñas. They have six children — one girl and five boys: Ria Christina (born 1984), Ryan Christopher, Rudys Caesar I, Rudys Caesar II, Rodolfo Jr. (+) and Rodolfo III. Before Carlson, Rodolfo Fariñas also has other two children from a previous relationship with Janet Murff, namely Rica Camille and Rey Carlos.

Allegations of domestic violence against husband
In a Probe Team interview in October 1996, Carlson accused her husband, then the governor of Ilocos Norte, of domestic violence. She narrated:

A week after, she appeared on the television program Magandang Gabi, Bayan, with her husband beside her and took back everything she had said against him. She told host Noli de Castro that she was just feeling insecure. "Baka dahil buntis po ako. Hindi ako maganda sa kanya. Puro motherhood, puro housewife na lang."

Before the 1996 allegations, Carlson had sought help from others.

Husband's response
Fariñas has reportedly denounced the women's organization KALAKASAN that intervened in Carlson's defense and accused the organization of "being lesbian-dominated".

Death
Carlson was pushed off the balcony from the 23rd floor of the Platinum 2000 condominium on November 23, 2001 in Greenhills, San Juan City. Carlson's maid said hours before her death, she and Carlson went to Malacañan Palace and tried to see President Gloria Macapagal Arroyo to show a video tape, which allegedly showed Carlson's husband hurting one of their children, who is a godson of Arroyo. She said Carlson was shouting "Rochille, bilisan mo, takbo! Hinahabol nila tayo (Rochille, hurry up! They're after us)!" and ran out of her room.
The couple was estranged at the time of her death.

Legacy
Task Force Maria is a coalition of at least 23 women's and people's organizations formed after Carlson's suicide. TFM took the Commission on Human Rights (CHR) to task for failing to act on Carlson's publicized disclosures, and later worked to reconcile two domestic violence bills in Congress in a unity bill. On March 8, 2004, Gloria Macapagal Arroyo signed Republic Act 9262 or the Anti-Violence Against Women and Children Act. It shields victims with protection orders without having to file a case in court. It recognizes the battered woman syndrome as a defense.

Filmography

Movies

Television

References

External links

1963 births
2001 deaths
20th-century comedians
Actresses from Metro Manila
Binibining Pilipinas winners
Filipino child actresses
Filipino women comedians
Filipino murder victims
Filipino people of American descent
Filipino television personalities
People from San Juan, Metro Manila
People murdered in the Philippines
Suicides by jumping in the Philippines
2001 suicides